The 1981 Belgian motorcycle Grand Prix was the ninth round of the 1981 Grand Prix motorcycle racing season. It took place on the weekend of 3–5 July 1981 at the Circuit de Spa-Francorchamps.

Classification

500 cc

References

Belgian motorcycle Grand Prix
Motorcycle Grand Prix
Belgian
July 1981 sports events in Europe